A sulfurtransferase is a transferase enzyme that act upon atoms of sulfur.

An example is thiosulfate sulfurtransferase.

References

External links

EC 2.8
Sulfur metabolism